Nakos Panourgias was a Greek commander during the Greek War of Independence, who rose to the rank of major general and was elected an MP in the independent Kingdom of Greece.

Life
Nakos Panourgias was born in Salona in 1795, as the son of the prominent  chieftain Dimitrios Panourgias. He became a warrior like his father, and distinguished himself for his bravery during the Greek War of Independence, fighting both under his father and under other chieftains. Governor Ioannis Kapodistrias named him a chiliarch in 1827. 

After independence, King Otto of Greece promoted him to major general, and he was elected as a member of the Hellenic Parliament for his native Amfissa from 1844 on.

He died at Amfissa in 1863.

References 

1795 births
1863 deaths
Hellenic Army major generals
Greek people of the Greek War of Independence
People from Amfissa
Greek MPs 1844–1847
Members of the Royal Phalanx